Kalipur refers to village in Barguna District of Barisal Division in Bangladesh.

It may also refer to:
Kalipur, Birbhum, a census town in West Bengal, India